Gold & Grey is the fifth studio album by American rock band Baroness, released on June 14, 2019, on the band's own label, Abraxan Hymns.

Background
As with previous releases by the band, the album's artwork was designed by front-man and lead singer John Dyer Baizley. The album is the band's first to feature new guitarist Gina Gleason and was mastered by frequent Flaming Lips collaborator Dave Fridmann who also produced Baroness' previous album. The first single from the album, "Borderlines", was released in March 2019.

The band debuted the album's first single, "Borderlines" in Houston at the start of their co-headlining tour with Deafheaven in March 2019.

Album artwork
As with all previous releases by the band, the cover art was done by front man Baizley and echoes themes seen on prior recordings that prominently feature scantily clad woman intertwined with scenes inspired by nature in a gold and grey color scheme, giving the album its name however, this may possibly be the last of such chromatically-themed album covers from the band. The art work was leaked by music identifying app Shazam which forced Baizley to release it early on the band's Twitter account.

Critical reception

Gold & Grey was well received and on aggregate website Metacritic, the album received a score of 91/100 from 14 critics indicating universal acclaim. Loudwire named it one of the 50 best rock albums of 2019.

Commercial Performance
Gold & Grey debuted at number one on the UK Rock & Metal Albums Chart, the highest chart position achieved by Baroness to date.

Track listing

Personnel
 John Dyer Baizley – lead vocals, backing vocals, rhythm guitar, percussion, piano, artwork
 Gina Gleason – lead guitar, backing vocals, keyboards, lead vocals, synthesizer
 Nick Jost – bass, synthesizer, keyboards
 Sebastian Thomson – drums

Charts

References

External links
 Music video for "Borderlines"

2019 albums
Baroness (band) albums
Albums produced by Dave Fridmann
Albums with cover art by John Dyer Baizley
Progressive rock albums by American artists
Albums recorded at Tarbox Road Studios